The 2019 Uzbekistan Pro-B League is the 2nd since its establishment. The competition started on 11 March 2019.

Teams and locations

League table

Zone "East"

Zone "West"

Championship Semi-finals

FINALS 

Turon and Zaamin qualified for 2020 Uzbekistan Pro League 2020 Uzbekistan  Pro League

References

External links 
 
Uzbekistan Pro League at PFL.uz
Uzbekistan Pro League News

Uzbekistan Pro-B League
2019 in Uzbekistani football leagues